The Fishermen is a sculpture by Jim and Christina Demetro, installed in Puerto Vallarta.

Description
The sculpture depicts a fisherman and his grandson napping, as well as a dog, a cat, a pelican, and a bucket of fish. Jim Demetro has said about the work's inspiration: 

An inscription reads, "This statue honors all fishermen and their important contributions to the history and traditions of Puerto Vallarta. This piece was supported by the generous contributions of citizens, the City Council, Mr. Arturo Dávalos Peña, Municipal President, Dr. Ramón González Lomelí, Director of Tourism Puerto Vallarta and Hotel Playa Los Arcos. Sculptors Jim Demetro and Christina Demetro. May 31, 2018".

History
The sculpture was unveiled on June 1, 2018. Prior to the unveiling, the sculptors created a clay model and raised funds for the bronze by allowing people to "co-sculpt" the artwork for donations.

References

External links

 

2018 establishments in Mexico
2018 sculptures
Cats in art
Fish in art
Outdoor sculptures in Puerto Vallarta
Sculptures of birds
Sculptures of children
Sculptures of dogs
Sculptures of men in Mexico
Statues in Jalisco
Zona Romántica